Neidalia eurygania is a moth of the family Erebidae first described by Herbert Druce in 1897. It is found in Panama.

References

Phaegopterina
Moths described in 1897